Kirkstall was a railway station in Kirkstall, City of Leeds, West Yorkshire.

History

The station was opened by the Midland Railway in 1860 and closed in March 1965 as part of the Beeching cuts. Originally located south of Kirkstall Bridge next to today's Wyther Lane, it had been moved north of it by 1906.  It was demolished after closure and no trace now remains.

References

Disused railway stations in Leeds
Railway stations in Great Britain opened in 1846
Railway stations in Great Britain closed in 1965
Beeching closures in England
Former Midland Railway stations
1847 establishments in England